Malaysia competed in the 1990 Asian Games in Beijing, China from 22 September to 7 October 1990. Malaysia ended the games at 8 overall medals. Alexander Lee Yu Lung was the head of the delegation.

Medal summary

Medals by sport

Medallists

Athletics

Women
Track event

Badminton

Field hockey

Men's tournament
Ranked 3rd in final standings

Football

Men's tournament
Group B

Ranked 12th in final standings

Sepaktakraw

Men's team

Ranked 1st in final standings

Swimming

Men

References

Nations at the 1990 Asian Games
1990
Asian Games